Wentworth was a station on the Englewood Branch of the Chicago 'L'. The station opened on December 10, 1905, and closed on February 9, 1992. and demolished during the Green Line reconstruction of 1994–1996.

References

Defunct Chicago "L" stations
Railway stations in the United States opened in 1905
Railway stations closed in 1992
1905 establishments in Illinois
1992 disestablishments in Illinois